Roy Bunny Milton (July 31, 1907 – September 18, 1983) was an American R&B and jump blues singer, drummer and bandleader.

Career
Milton's grandmother was Chickasaw. He was born in Wynnewood, Oklahoma, and grew up on an Indian reservation before moving to Tulsa, Oklahoma. He joined the Ernie Fields band in the late 1920s as singer and, later, drummer.

After moving to Los Angeles, in 1933, he formed his own band, the Solid Senders, with Camille Howard on piano. He performed in local clubs and began recording in the 1940s, his first release being "Milton's Boogie" on his own record label. His big break came in 1945, when his "R.M. Blues", on the new Juke Box label, became a hit, reaching number 2 on the Billboard R&B chart and number 20 on the pop chart. Its success helped establish Art Rupe's company, which he shortly afterwards renamed Specialty Records.

In 1950, Milton and his Orchestra performed at the sixth famed Cavalcade of Jazz concert held at Wrigley Field in Los Angeles which was produced by Leon Hefflin, Sr. on June 25. Also featured on the same day were Lionel Hampton & His Orchestra, Pee Wee Crayton's Orchestra, Dinah Washington, Tiny Davis & Her Hell Divers, and other artists. 16,000 were reported to be in attendance and the concert ended early because of a fracas in the crowd while Hampton's band played "Flying Home".

Milton and his band became a major touring attraction, and he continued to record successfully for Specialty Records through the late 1940s and early 1950s. He recorded a total of 19 Top Ten R&B hits, the biggest being "Hop, Skip and Jump" (number 3 R&B, 1948), "Information Blues" (number 2 R&B, 1950), and "Best Wishes" (number 2 R&B, 1951). He left Specialty in 1955. However, releases on other labels were unsuccessful, and with the emergence of rock and roll his style of music became unfashionable by the middle of the decade.

He continued to perform, appearing as a member of the Johnny Otis band at the Monterey Jazz Festival in 1970, and he resumed his recording career in the 1970s with albums for Kent Records (Roots of Rock, Vol. 1: The Great Roy Milton, Kent KST-554), and for the French label Black & Blue Records (Instant Groove, Black & Blue 33.114).

Milton died in Los Angeles on September 18, 1983, aged 76.

The Solid Senders (band members)
 drums - Roy Milton
 piano - Camille Howard
 bass - Edward David Robinson, Clarence Jones (1947), Dallas Bartley (1947–50), Billy Hadnott (1951–52)
 guitar - Johnny George "Junior" Rogers (1947–53), James Davis (1954)
 alto saxophone - Earl Simms, Caughey Roberts, Clifton Noel (1947–48), John Kelson (AKA Jackie Kelso) (1948–52)
 tenor saxophone - Lorenzo "Buddy" Floyd, Bill Gaither (1947), Benny Waters (1948–50), Eddie Taylor (1950–52)
 trumpet - Hosea Sapp, Jimmy Nottingham, Aaron Arthur Walker (1948–50), Charles Gillum (1950–52)

Discography
 Rock 'n' Roll Versus Rhythm and Blues (Dooto, 1959) split album with Chuck Higgins
 Roots of Rock, Vol. 1: The Great Roy Milton (Kent, 1971) produced by Johnny Otis
 R.M. Blues (Specialty, 1974)
 Roy Milton & His Solid Senders (Sonet, 1976)
 Great Rhythm & Blues Oldies, Volume 9: Roy Milton (Blues Spectrum, 1977)
 Instant Groove (Black & Blue, 1977; reissue: Classic Jazz, 1984)
 The Grandfather of R&B (Jukebox Lil, 1981)
 Big Fat Mama (Jukebox Lil, 1985)

CD releases
 ROY MILTON & HIS SOLID SENDERS (Specialty 7008; Ace CHD 308)
 GROOVY BLUES: Roy Milton & His Solid Senders, Vol. 2 (Specialty 7024; Ace CHD 435)
 BLOWIN' WITH ROY: Roy Milton & His Solid Senders, Vol. 3 (Specialty 7060; Ace CHD 575) [these 3 volumes include material that Roy and his band recorded for the Specialty label between 1947 and 1953, plus the 4 earlier recordings he made for Juke Box Records in 1945.]
 DOOTONE ROCK 'N' RHYTHM AND BLUES (Ace CHD 839) [a various artists label sampler/overview that includes all of Roy's Dootone material.]
 The Chronological ROY MILTON 1945-1946 (Classics "Blues & Rhythm Series" 5041) [includes Roy's 4 Hamp-Tone recordings, his 4 Juke Box recordings, and the numerous recordings he made for his own Roy Milton and Miltone labels before he signed with Specialty Records in 1947.]
 Roy Milton's MILTONE RECORDS STORY (Acrobat ADDCD 3016) [1946-1948 recordings from Roy's own specialty labels: Roy Milton, Miltone, Ace, and Foto, featuring various vocalists/artists with backing by Roy and his bandmates (under the guise of 'The Blenders'); also includes outside source material licensed from DeLuxe Records and distributed by Miltone.]

References

External links
[ Milton biography] at AllMusic

1907 births
1983 deaths
People from Wynnewood, Oklahoma
Musicians from Tulsa, Oklahoma
Singers from Los Angeles
American rhythm and blues musicians
Jump blues musicians
Specialty Records artists
Kent Records artists
West Coast blues musicians
American people of Chickasaw descent
20th-century African-American male singers
20th-century Native Americans